Momentum is the debut studio album from American recording artist TobyMac. It was released on November 6, 2001, through ForeFront Records.

The album was well received and was nominated for a Grammy. It contains a message of tolerance and diversity in society.

Musically it has an urban pop sound which HM commented contains shadows of early DC Talk material. In 2003, Re:Mix Momentum was released.

Background 

In the later months of 2000, DC Talk, announced plans to take a hiatus. In November an album, Intermission: The Greatest Hits, was released to commemorate the break. Following this, an extended play titled Solo was released on April 24, 2001, implying that solo careers were impending. The first two solo releases were Empty, released July 3 by Tait and Stereotype Be released August 28 by Kevin Max. Momentums release was pushed back due to the September 11 attacks, and was released on November 6, 2001.

Critical reception
Jesus Freak Hideout's John DiBiase claimed "Momentum does in fact live up to its title. It has [momentum], slamming the listener with truthful lyrics, an honest message, and infectious rhythms and rhymes." Ashleigh Kittle of AllMusic stated "Momentum, an album reminiscent of DC Talk's early work, sets itself apart as a project highly deserving of the title 'much anticipated'. It is intricately detailed with layers of musical depth, combined with strong social messages such as racial reconciliation. And so it is with this release that tobyMac continues to reveal that he is indeed a modern day Renaissance man." Cross Rhythms' David Bain said "This eclectic album takes you on a breathtaking tour of diverse styles from gospel, on 'J Train' which features Kirk Franklin, to hard music, 'Yours' and 'Extreme Days' (featured on the film soundtrack), to the more subtle shades of hip hop, 'Irene' and 'In The Air' (a take of a classic Motown hit), all with Toby's infectious touch of rap throughout. The mixture of so many styles on this project made it tricky to place it under a category — perhaps rock would have been just as apt! But don't let that put you off, as the production and lyrical quality is suburb, with talented contributions coming from the likes of DJ Form, DJ Maj, Pete Stewart, Mooki and Otto Price. A great album for group playing and personal listening as there is something for everyone (well, almost!)."

Track listing

Notes
"What's Goin' Down" samples the Buffalo Springfield song "For What It's Worth"
"Do You Know" samples the Diana Ross song "Theme from Mahogany (Do You Know Where You're Going To)"
"Somebody's Watching" samples the Rockwell song "Somebody's Watching Me"

History 

Besides being tobyMac's only studio album not to crack the top 100 on the Billboard 200, Momentum is his longest studio album by track listing and second-longest by duration (beaten only by Welcome to Diverse City).

Personnel

 TobyMac – lead vocals, background vocals, drum programming
 Mooki – background vocals, drum programming, keyboards
 Pete Stewart – guitars, bass, Wurlitzer, programming, background vocals
 Jeff Savage – programming, B3, keyboards, turntables, piano, analog bass, background vocals
 Brian Haley – drums
 Barry Graul – guitars
 Tony Lucido – bass
 Dave Wyatt – keyboards
 Michael Ripoll – guitars
 Scott Savage – percussion
 John Mark Painter - Horns, Bass, Percussion, Drums, String Arrangement, Guitar

Charts

Certifications

References

TobyMac albums
2001 debut albums
ForeFront Records albums